Two ships of the United States Navy have been named USS Doyen for Charles A. Doyen.  

  (originally AP-2), a transport, commissioned in 1943 and decommissioned in 1946.

United States Navy ship names